Eldas is a constituency in Kenya. It elects one MP to the National Assembly.

History 
The constituency was formed during the 2013 Kenya general election.
During the 2022 Kenyan general election, the constituency returning officer was hospitalised after being shot in the leg.

MPs

References 

Constituencies in Wajir County